Park Road Courts is an apartment building and an historic structure located in the Columbia Heights neighborhood in Washington, D.C.  It is three-story brick building built on a raised basement.  The architectural firm of Hunter & Bell designed the structure that was completed in 1916.  It was listed on the National Register of Historic Places in 2012.

References

Residential buildings completed in 1916
Apartment buildings in Washington, D.C.
Residential buildings on the National Register of Historic Places in Washington, D.C.